Spamalot (also known as Monty Python's Spamalot) is a musical with music by John Du Prez and Eric Idle, and lyrics and a book by Idle. It is based on the 1975 film Monty Python and the Holy Grail.  

Like the motion picture, it is a highly irreverent parody of the Arthurian legend, but it differs from the film in many ways. The original 2005 Broadway production, directed by Mike Nichols, received 14 Tony Awards nominations, winning in three categories, including Best Musical. During its initial run of 1,575 performances, it was seen by more than two million people and grossed over $175 million. Tim Curry starred as King Arthur in the original Broadway and West End productions. It was one of eight UK musicals commemorated on Royal Mail stamps, issued in February 2011.

A Paramount Pictures film adaptation, directed by Casey Nicholaw in his directorial debut from a script by Idle, was in pre-production as of 2021.

Synopsis

Before the show
A recording encourages members of the audience to "let your cellphones and pagers ring willy-nilly," and comments that they should "be aware there are heavily armed knights on stage that may drag you on stage and impale you." This was recorded by Eric Idle.

Act I
A historian narrates a brief overview of medieval England. In a miscommunication between the actors and the narrator, the actors sing an introductory song about Finland ("Fisch Schlapping Song"). The Historian returns, irritated, and tells the frolicking Finns that he was talking about England, not Finland.  The scene immediately changes to a dreary, dark village with penitent monks in hooded robes chanting Latin and hitting themselves with books. King Arthur travels the land with his servant Patsy, who follows him around banging two coconut shells together to make the sound of a horse's hooves as Arthur "rides" before him, trying to recruit Knights of the Round Table to join him in Camelot. He encounters a pair of sentries who are more interested in debating whether two swallows could successfully carry a coconut than in listening to the king.

Sir Robin, a collector of plague victims, and Lancelot, a large, handsome and incredibly violent man, meet as Lancelot attempts to dispose of the sickly Not Dead Fred. Although a plague victim, the man insists that he is not dead yet and he can dance and sing. He completes a dance number, but is soon hit over the head with a shovel and killed by an impatient Lancelot ("He Is Not Dead Yet"). They agree to become Knights of the Round Table together, Lancelot for the fighting, and Robin for the singing and the dancing.

Arthur attempts to convince a peasant named Dennis Galahad that he, Arthur, is King of England because the Lady of the Lake gave him Excalibur, the sword given only to the man fit to rule England. However, Dennis and his mother, Mrs Galahad, are political radicals and deny that any king who has not been elected by the people has any legitimate right to rule over them. To settle the issue, Arthur has the Lady of the Lake and her Laker Girls appear to turn Dennis into a knight ("Come with Me"). Cheered on by the girls ("Laker Girls Cheer"), the Lady of the Lake turns Dennis into Sir Galahad and together, they sing a generic Broadway love song ("The Song That Goes Like This"), complete with chandelier. They are joined by Sir Robin and Sir Lancelot, and together with Sir Bedevere and the "aptly named" Sir Not-Appearing-In-This-Show (a knight resembling Don Quixote, who promptly apologises and leaves), they make up the Knights of the Round Table ("All for One").

The five knights gather in Camelot, a deliberately anachronistic place resembling Las Vegas's Camelot-inspired Excalibur resort, complete with showgirls, oversized dice and the Lady of the Lake headlining the castle in full Liza Minnelli get-up ("Knights of the Round Table" / "The Song That Goes Like This (Reprise)"). In the midst of their revelry, they are contacted by God (a recording voiced by John Cleese of the original Monty Python troupe and Eric Idle in the version that toured the UK) who tells them to locate the Holy Grail. Urged on by the Lady of the Lake ("Find Your Grail"), the Knights set off. They travel throughout the land until they reach a castle, only to be viciously taunted by lewd French soldiers. They attempt to retaliate by sending them a large wooden rabbit in the style of the Trojan horse; however, they realise after the fact that it was not as simple as leaving the rabbit and walking away – they should have hidden inside it.  Defeated, they leave in a hurry when the French begin taunting them again, sending cancan dancers after them and throwing barnyard animals including cows at them ("Run Away!"). Arthur and his followers manage to run into the safety of the wings before the French catapult the Trojan rabbit at them.

Act II
Sir Robin and his minstrels follow King Arthur and Patsy into a "dark and very expensive forest" (Arthur later says they're in a "dark and extremely expensive forest"), where they are separated. King Arthur meets the terrifying but silly Knights Who Say Ni, who demand a shrubbery. King Arthur despairs of finding one, but Patsy cheers him up ("Always Look on the Bright Side of Life") and they find a shrubbery shortly after.

Sir Robin, after wandering the forest for some time with his minstrels ("Brave Sir Robin"), encounters the Black Knight, who scares him off, but King Arthur, who happens on the scene, more or less defeats him by cutting off both his arms and legs, impaling his still-alive torso on a door, and leaving to give the Knights their shrubbery. The Knights accept it, but next demand that King Arthur put on a musical and bring it to Broadway (in the United Kingdom, this became a West End musical; on the tour, they must put on a "Broadway musical"), implying that it need only be Broadway-style, "but not an Andrew Lloyd Webber". The mere mention of his name causes everyone to cover their ears and scream in pain. Sir Robin, who has found Arthur by this point, insists that it would be impossible for them to accomplish this next task, since you need Jews for a successful Broadway (or West End) musical ("You Won't Succeed on Broadway"), and proves his point in a wild production number filled with  Fiddler on the Roof parodies, including a bottle dance with Grails instead of bottles. King Arthur and Patsy promptly set off in search of Jews.

(In countries that don't have a tradition of Jews in the theatre, the lyrics of "You Won't Succeed on Broadway" are sometimes changed to instead describe the high production standards and acting talent needed to stage a successful musical in that country.  For example, in the South Korean version, Sir Robin sings about recent successful musicals that were staged in Seoul during the previous decade.  Meanwhile, members of the ensemble appear onstage dressed as various characters from those musicals.  Among these characters are a cat from Cats, Kenickie from Grease, Kim from Miss Saigon, the Phantom from The Phantom of the Opera, and Velma Kelly from Chicago.  As with the original version of the song, Sir Robin and the entire ensemble end the number with a song and dance routine.)

While the Lady of the Lake laments her lack of stage time ("Whatever Happened to My Part?"), Sir Lancelot receives a letter from what he assumes is a young damsel in distress. He is very surprised to find that the "damsel" is actually an effeminate young man named Prince Herbert ("Where Are You?" / "Here Are You") whose overbearing, music-hating father, the King of Swamp Castle, is forcing him into an arranged marriage. As Herbert is asking Lancelot to help him escape, the King of Swamp Castle cuts the rope that he is using to climb out of the window, and Herbert falls to his apparent death. Lancelot is a bit puzzled at the king's actions, but it is revealed that Herbert was saved at the last minute by Lancelot's sidekick, Concorde. The King asks his son how he was saved, exactly, to which Herbert replies happily with a song. But the king charges at his son with a spear, preparing to kill him. Lancelot steps in to save him, then gives a tearful, heartfelt speech to the king about sensitivity on Herbert's behalf, and Lancelot is outed as homosexual in the process, an announcement celebrated in a wild disco number ("His Name Is Lancelot").

King Arthur begins to give up hope of ever putting on the Broadway musical and laments that he is alone, even though Patsy has been with him the entire time ("I'm All Alone"). The Lady of the Lake appears and tells Arthur that he and the Knights have been in a Broadway musical all along (in some productions she also points out Patsy's presence, to which Arthur claims that he sees Patsy as "family" and thus doesn't always consider him a separate person). Patsy also reveals he is half Jewish, but didn't want to say anything to Arthur because "that's not really the sort of thing you say to a heavily armed Christian." All that's left is for King Arthur to find the Grail and marry someone. After picking up on some not-too-subtle hints, Arthur decides to marry the Lady of the Lake after he finds the Grail ("Twice in Every Show").

Reunited with his Knights, Arthur meets Tim the Enchanter who warns them of the danger of a killer rabbit. When the rabbit bites a knight's head off, Arthur uses the Holy Hand Grenade of Antioch against it, knocking down a nearby hill and revealing that the "evil rabbit" was actually a puppet controlled by a surprised puppeteer. A large stone block showing a combination of letters and numbers is also revealed. (The letters are based on the seat numbering system used by each theatre. They are changed from performance to performance to discourage audience members from intentionally booking any of the possible seats.  The seat is typically on the aisle in one of the first few rows nearest the orchestra. In the Broadway production and on the tour it is either A101, B101, C101 or D101; i.e., Seat 101 – which is house right of the center aisle – of Rows A, B, C, or D. In the West End production a word is revealed – DONE, CONE or BONE, referring to D1, C1 and B1 respectively.) After pondering the final clue, Arthur admits that they're "a bit stumped with the clue thing" and asks God to "give them a hand". A large hand points to the audience and Arthur realises that the letters and numbers refer to a seat number in the audience. The grail is "found" (with some sleight of hand) under the seat and the person sitting in the seat is rewarded with a small trophy and a polaroid photo ("The Holy Grail"). Arthur marries the Lady of the Lake, who reveals that her name is Guinevere; Lancelot marries Herbert (who finally has a chance to sing); and Sir Robin decides to pursue a career in musical theatre. Herbert's father attempts to interrupt the finale and stop all of the "bloody singing", but is hit over the head with a shovel by Lancelot, a nod to "He Is Not Yet Dead" ("Act 2 Finale / Always Look on the Bright Side of Life (Company Bow)").

The overall duration of the show is about two hours plus interval time.

Musical numbers
Eric Idle wrote the musical's book and lyrics and collaborated with John Du Prez on the music, except for "Finland", which was written by Michael Palin for Monty Python's Contractual Obligation Album; "Knights of the Round Table" and "Brave Sir Robin", which were composed by Neil Innes for Monty Python and the Holy Grail; and "Always Look on the Bright Side of Life", which was originally written by Idle for the film Monty Python's Life of Brian.

 Act I
 Overture – Orchestra
 "Fisch Schlapping Song" – Mayor, Ensemble
 "Monk's Chant" – Monks
 "King Arthur’s Song" – King Arthur, Patsy**
 "He Is Not Dead Yet" – Not Dead Fred, Lancelot, Robin, Men
 "Come with Me" – Lady of the Lake
 "Laker Girls" – King Arthur, Patsy, Laker Girls
 "The Song That Goes Like This" – Galahad, Lady of the Lake, Women
 "All for One" – King Arthur, Patsy, Robin, Lancelot, Galahad, Bedevere
 "Knights of the Round Table/The Song That Goes like this (Reprise)" – King Arthur, Patsy, Lancelot, Robin, Galahad, Bedevere, Lady of the Lake, Company
 "Find Your Grail" – Lady of the Lake, King Arthur, Company
 "Run Away" – The French Taunter, French Guards, King Arthur, Patsy, Robin, Lancelot, Galahad, Bedevere, Company

 Act II
 "Always Look on the Bright Side of Life" – Patsy, King Arthur, Men
 "Brave Sir Robin" – Minstrels
 "You Won't Succeed on Broadway" – Robin, Ensemble‡
 "Whatever Happened to My Part?" – Lady of the Lake
 "Where Are You?" – Prince Herbert
 "His Name Is Lancelot" – Lancelot, Prince Herbert, Men
 "I'm All Alone" – King Arthur, Patsy, Men
 "Twice in Every Show" - King Arthur, Lady of The Lake
 "The Grail" – King Arthur, Patsy, Lancelot, Robin, Galahad, Bedevere,** 
 "Finale" – Herbert, Lancelot, Robin, King Arthur, Lady of the Lake, Company
 "Always Look on the Bright Side of Life (Company Bow)" – Company

**Does not appear on the original cast album.

Notes
The song "You Won't Succeed on Broadway" was changed to "You Won't Succeed in Showbiz" for the London production and later replaced with the "Star Song" on the UK tour.

Characters

Court of Camelot

 King Arthur of Britain
 Sir Lancelot the Homicidally Brave
 Sir Robin, the Not-Quite-So-Brave-as-Sir-Lancelot
 Sir Dennis Galahad, the Dashingly Handsome
 Sir Bedevere, the Strangely Flatulent

 Patsy, King Arthur's trusty servant/steed and constant companion
 Concorde, Lancelot's trusty servant/steed
 Brother Maynard, Camelot's clergyman
 Sir Bors
 Sir Not-Appearing-In-This-Show, dressed as Don Quixote

Other characters

 The Lady of the Lake
 Not Dead Fred
 Robin's Lead Minstrel
 The King of Swamp Castle (a.k.a. Herbert's Father)
 Prince Herbert
 French Taunter
 The Black Knight
 The Head Knight Who Says "Ni!"
 Tim the Enchanter
 Mrs Galahad

 The Killer Rabbit of Caerbannog
 Swamp Castle Guards
 Two Sentries
 Historian: the Narrator
 The Laker Girls
 Knights of the Round Table
 Robin's Minstrels
 God
 Holder of the Holy Grail

Doubling of parts
In tribute to the film, where six actors played the majority of the male parts (and a few female ones), several actors play multiple roles; the only major characters not doubling are Arthur and the Lady of the Lake. In the Broadway production, the following doubling is used:

 Lancelot/2nd Sentry/The French Taunter/Knight of Ni/Tim the Enchanter
 Robin/1st Sentry/Brother Maynard/2nd Guard
 Galahad/King of Swamp Castle/Black Knight
 Patsy/Mayor of Finland/1st Guard
 Bedevere/Mrs Galahad/Concorde
 The Historian/Prince Herbert/Not Dead Fred/Lead Minstrel/The French Taunter's Best Friend

Sara Ramirez doubled as a witch and a cow in the Chicago previews, but both parts were cut during the pre-Broadway run. Several pairs of characters originally played by the same Monty Python member were reduced to one: the Dead Collector and Sir Robin (Idle), the Large Man with a Dead Body and Sir Lancelot (Cleese), and Dennis the Active Peasant and Sir Galahad (Michael Palin).

Casts

Notable Broadway cast replacements
Sir Lancelot: Steve Kazee, Alan Tudyk, Rick Holmes
Lady of the Lake: Lauren Kennedy, Marin Mazzie, Hannah Waddingham, Merle Dandridge
King Arthur: Simon Russell Beale, Harry Groener, Jonathan Hadary, Richard McCourt, Stephen Collins, Michael Siberry, John O'Hurley
Sir Galahad: Lewis Cleale, Bradley Dean
Prince Herbert: Tom Deckman
Sir Robin: Martin Moran, Clay Aiken, Robert Petkoff
Patsy: Dominic Wood, David Hibbard, Drew Lachey
Sir Bedevere: Brad Oscar

Notable West End cast replacements
Notable West End cast replacements have included Peter Davison and Bill Ward in 2007 and Marin Mazzie, in early 2008. Sanjeev Bhaskar (King Arthur), Michael Xavier (Sir Galahad) and Nina Söderquist (Lady of the Lake) were part of the closing cast.

Production history

Chicago

Previews of the show began in Chicago's Shubert Theatre (now the CIBC Theatre) on 21 December 2004; the show officially opened there on 9 January 2005.

Two musical numbers were dropped from Act One while the production was still in Chicago. During the scene set in the "Witch Village", the torch song "Burn Her!" was originally performed by Sir Bedevere, The Witch, Sir Robin, Lancelot and Villagers. At the French Castle, "The Cow Song", in a parody of a stereotypical film noir/cabaret style, was performed by The Cow and French Citizens. Before the two songs were cut in Chicago, the lead vocals in both songs were sung by Sara Ramirez. This gave the Lady of the Lake six songs in Act One, but no further appearances until scene five in Act Two, for "The Diva's Lament".

Broadway

The musical previewed on Broadway, at New York's Shubert Theatre, beginning 14 February 2005, ahead of an official opening on 17 March.  Mike Nichols directed, and Casey Nicholaw choreographed.  The production won the Tony Award for Best Musical and was nominated for 14 Tony Awards. The show played its final performance on 11 January 2009 after 35 previews and 1,575 performances; it was seen by more than two million people and grossed over $175 million, recouping its initial production costs in under six months.

The original Broadway cast included Tim Curry as King Arthur, Michael McGrath as Patsy, David Hyde Pierce as Sir Robin, Hank Azaria as Sir Lancelot and other roles (e.g., the French Taunter, Knight of Ni, and Tim the Enchanter), Christopher Sieber as Sir Galahad and other roles (e.g., the Black Knight and Prince Herbert's Father), and Sara Ramirez as the Lady of the Lake. It also included Christian Borle as Prince Herbert and other roles (e.g., the Historian and Not Dead Fred), Steve Rosen as Sir Bedevere and other roles (e.g., Concorde and Dennis's Mother) and John Cleese as the (recorded) Voice of God.

US touring productions
First national tour (2006–2009)
[[File:Natl Theatre Washington.JPG|thumb|right|200px|Spamalot'''s North American tour took it to Washington, D.C.'s National Theatre in May 2006.]]
A North American tour commenced in spring 2006, and the cast included Michael Siberry as King Arthur, Jeff Dumas as Patsy, Richard Holmes as Lancelot, Bradley Dean as Galahad and Tom Deckman as The Historian. The tour won three 2007 Touring Broadway Awards, including Best New Musical. Richard Chamberlain later joined the tour as King Arthur.tour information  montypythonsspamalot.com. Retrieved 26 February 2009 The tour continued through the summer 2009, and played its final performances at the Segerstrom Hall in Costa Mesa where it closed on 18 October 2009.
Second/Third national tour (2010–2013)
A second North American tour launched on 24 September 2010 from Waterbury, Connecticut, and ended 26 June 2011 in Dallas, Texas. This tour featured a non-Equity cast that included Caroline Bowman as the Lady of the Lake. Another non-Equity North American tour was undertaken in 2013.

Hollywood Bowl (2015)
A three evening performance at the Hollywood Bowl was undertaken in 2015, with Eric Idle appearing in the role of The Historian, and other cast members including Christian Slater, Jesse Tyler Ferguson, Craig Robinson, Merle Dandridge, Warwick Davis, Kevin Chamberlin and Rick Holmes.  The script was updated and included many Los Angeles specific jokes.

West End

A London production opened at the Palace Theatre on Shaftesbury Avenue in the West End, commencing 30 September 2006 (London premiere 17 October). Tim Curry and Christopher Sieber reprised their roles from the Broadway production. They were joined by Hannah Waddingham as the Lady of the Lake, Tom Goodman-Hill as Sir Lancelot, Robert Hands as Sir Robin, David Birell as Patsy, Tony Timberlake as Sir Bedevere and Darren Southworth as Prince Herbert. The London production closed on 3 January 2009.

 UK touring production/West End revival 
A UK tour scheduled for later in 2009 was initially postponed, the producers commenting "Due to unforeseen circumstances the UK Tour of Spamalot will not be taking place as scheduled in 2009", but eventually started at the New Wimbledon Theatre on 29 May – 5 June 2010. Phill Jupitus played King Arthur in the UK tour.
Todd Carty played Patsy, assistant to King Arthur for the duration of the tour. Marcus Brigstocke made his musical theatre debut as King Arthur following Jupitus' departure. Jodie Prenger, Hayley Tamaddon, Amy Nuttall and Jessica Martin shared the role of The Lady of the Lake.

The UK tour also featured for the first time a re-working of the song "You Won't Succeed on Broadway" which has been renamed "You Won't Succeed in Showbiz". The theme of the song has been changed from poking fun at the need for Jewish input into Broadway productions and instead mocks the cross over of celebrities in musicals and reality television competitions such as The X Factor. It notably pokes fun at reality TV celebrities including Simon Cowell, Cheryl Cole and Susan Boyle (who is shot by Sir Robin when she begins to sing).

The touring production played a limited seven-week run in the West End during the summer of 2012 at the Harold Pinter Theatre. Marcus Brigstocke shared the role of King Arthur with Jon Culshaw for those seven weeks, with Bonnie Langford playing Lady of the Lake. The production moved to the Playhouse Theatre on 14 November 2012, and ran until 12 April 2014. During 2013 a number of celebrities each played the part of God for a week in aid of charity, including Professor Brian Cox, Gary Lineker, Barbara Windsor, Brian May and Michael Palin.

Other notable cast members during the run of the West End revival included Stephen Tompkinson, Joe Pasquale, Les Dennis and Richard McCourt as King Arthur, Anna-Jane Casey and Carley Stenson as Lady of the Lake, Warwick Davis and Dominic Wood as Patsy, Daniel Boys as Sir Lancelot and Jon Robyns as Sir Galahad.

A production in April 2015 at the Churchill Theatre, Bromley starred Joe Pasquale, Todd Carty and Sarah Earnshaw.

Las Vegas
A production of the musical began Las Vegas, Nevada, previewed on 8 March 2007 and opened on 31 March 2007 at the Wynn Las Vegas in the newly renamed Grail Theater. As with other Las Vegas transfers of Broadway musicals, including The Phantom of the Opera, Spamalot was condensed to run in ninety minutes without an intermission. Among the cuts were the song "All For One", most of the song "Run Away", the Knights of Ni receiving their shrubbery, and the "Make sure he doesn't leave" scene with Prince Herbert's guards.

Actor John O'Hurley starred as King Arthur, with J Anthony Crane playing Lancelot. Due to the Las Vegas production, the North American touring company would not perform in California, Arizona, or Nevada. Although initially contracted to run for up to ten years its final performance was on 18 July 2008.

International productions
A new Australian production started in Melbourne in November 2007 at Her Majesty's Theatre, with the official premiere on 1 December. The cast featured Bille Brown as King Arthur, Ben Lewis as Sir Galahad, Stephen Hall as Sir Lancelot and Mark Conaghan as Prince Herbert The Australian production closed on 5 April 2008, due to lack of ticket sales and no tour followed. In October 2014, Harvest Rain Theatre Company under the direction of producer Tim O'Connor staged a production of Spamalot with a cast list including Jon English as King Arthur, Simon Gallaher as Patsy, Julie Anthony as the Lady of the Lake, Frank Woodley as Sir Robin, Chris Kellett as Sir Lancelot, and Stephen Hirst as Galahad. The production was presented in The Concert Hall at QPAC in Brisbane.

The first translated production, in Spanish, ran at Teatre Victoria, Barcelona from 9 September 2008 to 10 May 2009. Directed by Catalan Comedy Group Tricicle and choreographed by Francesc Abós, the cast included Jordi Bosch as King Arthur and Marta Ribera as the Lady of the Lake. The production moved to Madrid in September 2009 A German production premiered in January 2009 at the Musical Dome in Cologne. The Hungarian production in Madach Theatre, Budapest premiered on 29 September 2009 with three casts, each actor taking up multiple roles. The Swedish production opened on the Malmö Nöjesteater in Malmö on 24 September 2010, with a cast including Johan Wester as King Arthur and Johan Glans as Sir Robin. The production moved to Oscarsteatern in Stockholm on 15 September 2011 where it played through 29 April 2012. Nina Söderquist, who starred as Lady of the Lake in the West End production was thought to reprise her role, but became pregnant. She joined the show when it moved to Stockholm, along with Henrik Hjelt as Sir Belvedere. In May 2011, the original UK touring production played at Politeama Rossetti in Trieste. Eric Idle attended the opening night on 24 May.

The Mexican premiere of the show was in July 2011 in Mexico City. The show ran for over 500 performances across the country. The Japanese production ran from 9 to 22 January 2012 at the Akasaka Blitz theater in Tokyo before playing Morinomiya Piloti Hall in Osaka from 2 February to February to 6 February. The production featured Yūsuke Santamaria as King Arthus, Aya Hirano as Lady of the Lake, Magy as Patsy, Yuya Matsushita as Sir Galahad and Tsuyoshi Muro as Prince Herbert. The South Korean production was presented by OD Musical Company, and CJ Entertainment's Performing Arts division (now a part of CJ E&M); incidentally, CJ CheilJedang, the sister company of CJ Group's entertainment business, manufactures Spam products under license since 1987. It played from 1 October to 28 December 2010, with Yesung of Super Junior and Park In-bae rotating as Sir Galahad. A Norwegian production ran from September to December 2012, with a cast featuring Atle Antonsen as King Arthur, Trond Espen Seim as Sir Lancelot, Anders Baasmo Christiansen as Sir Robin, Espen Beranek Holm as Sir Belvedere and Trond Fausa Aurvåg as Prince Herbert. A Serbian production at Sava Centar in Belgrade had a cast including Nikola Kojo as King Arthur, Nikola Đuričko as Sir Lancelot and Gordan Kičić as Sir Robin.

 Title 
Book-writer and lyricist Eric Idle explained the title in a February 2004 press release:

Reactions by Monty Python members

The show has had mixed reactions from Idle's former colleagues in Monty Python.

Terry Gilliam, in an audio interview, describes it as "Python-lite". He later told the BBC News, "It helps with the pension fund, and it helps keep Python alive. As much as we'd like to pull the plug on the whole thing it carries on – it's got a life of its own."

Terry Jones – who co-directed the original film with Gilliam – expressed his opinions forthrightly in May 2005:  "Spamalot is utterly pointless. It's full of air … Regurgitating Python is not high on my list of priorities." However, when asked whether he liked Spamalot during an interview with Dennis Daniel on 98.5 WBON-FM The Bone shortly after the musical's opening on Broadway, Jones said, "Well, I thought it was terrific good fun.  It's great to see the audience loving it. I suppose I had reservations as far as … well … the idea of doing scenes from a film on stage. I just don’t get the point of it. They do them terribly well … I mean, they really are good … but I just quite don’t understand what that's about.  It isn’t really 'Python.' It is very much Eric." Jones went on to say, "I think the best parts of the musical are the new things. For instance, when they do the Andrew Lloyd Webber take-off and this girl comes in and sings 'Whatever Happened to My Part' since she hasn’t appeared since the opening number and she's really furious! That is one of the great moments where the show really comes alive for me."

In an October 2006 interview, Michael Palin said, "We’re all hugely delighted that Spamalot is doing so well. Because we’re all beneficiaries! It's a great show. It's not 'Python' as we would have written it. But then, none of us would get together and write a 'Python' stage show. Eric eventually ran out of patience and said, 'Well, I’ll do it myself then.' He sent us bits and songs and all that and we said, 'Yeah, that's all right, have a go.' But its success is so enormous that it took us all by surprise, including Eric, and now we’re just proud to be associated with it, rather pathetically."

When asked by a Las Vegas Review-Journal reporter in 2008 if he had to be persuaded to provide the recorded voice of God in the musical, John Cleese said, "Yeah, that's right. And in the end I think Spamalot turned out splendidly. It's had a tremendous run. I defy anyone to go and not have a really fun evening. It's the silliest thing I’ve ever seen and I think Eric did a great job."

The last verse of the "Finland"/"Fisch Slapping Dance" was incorporated into Spam sketch for the 2014 reunion show Monty Python Live (Mostly).

Critical reception and box-office
The original production has been both a financial and critical success. Variety reported advance ticket sales of $18 million, with ticket prices ranging from $36 to $179. The advance made Broadway box office history.

The show proved to be an early success when moving to London's West End. After high advance ticket sales the show's run was extended by four weeks, four months before the run commenced.
The play makes many references to the film and other material in the Python canon, including a line from "The Lumberjack Song", nods to "Ministry of Silly Walks", the "Election Night Special" and "Dead Parrot sketch" routines, a bar from "Spam" worked into "Knights of the Round Table", a rendition of the song "Always Look on the Bright Side of Life" from the film Monty Python's Life of Brian (1979), and the "Fisch Schlapping Song" which is a reference to both "The Fish-Slapping Dance" and the song "Finland".  Another reference is actually part of the Playbill of the show; there are several gag pages about a musical entitled "Dik Od Triaanenen Fol (Finns Ain't What They Used To Be)". This gag programme was written by Palin, and echoes the faux-Swedish subtitles in the credits of the original Grail Python film.

Broadway musical fans appreciate its references to other musicals and musical theatre in general, such as: "The Song That Goes Like This" (a spoof of Andrew Lloyd Webber productions and many other Broadway power ballads); "Whatever Happened To My Part" reminiscent of "And I'm Telling You I'm Not Going" from Dreamgirls, the knights doing a dance reminiscent of Fiddler on the Roof, and another reminiscent of West Side Story (including the music); Sir Lancelot's mimicking of Peter Allen in "His Name Is Lancelot"; the character of Sir Not-Appearing-In-This-Show being Man of La Manchas Don Quixote; a member of the French "army" dressed as Eponine from Les Misérables; and a line pulled from "Another Hundred People" from Stephen Sondheim's Company by the "damsel" Herbert. The song "You Won't Succeed (On Broadway)" also parodies The Producers and Yentl.

The show has not escaped criticism. In Slate, Sam Anderson wrote,
"Python was formed in reaction to exactly the kind of lazy comedy represented by Spamalot — what Michael Palin once described as the 'easy, catch-phrase reaction' the members had all been forced to pander in their previous writing jobs... Spamalot is the gaudy climax of a long, unfunny tradition of post-Python exploitation – books, actions figures, video games – that treats the old material as a series of slogans to be referenced without doing any of the work that made the lines so original in the first place."

The West End version opened to rave reviews. "It's a wonderful night, and I fart in the general direction of anyone who says otherwise", wrote Charles Spencer in the Daily Telegraph (echoing a joke from the show). According to Paul Taylor in the Independent, "it leaves you that high and weak with laughter, thanks not just to the Python provenance of the basic material but to the phenomenal speed, wit, cheek and showbiz knowingness of the direction, which is by the great veteran, Mike Nichols". Michael Billington in the Guardian was less enthusiastic, though, stating "while I'm happy to see musicals spoofed, the show's New York origins are clearly exposed in a would-be outre number which announces "we won't succeed in show business if we don't have any Jews": a Broadway in-joke that has little purchase this side of the Atlantic." Billington adds, "With hand on heart, I'd much rather watch Lerner and Loewe's Camelot than Eric Idle's smart-arsed Spamalot."

The Las Vegas production was awarded the Number 1 show of 2007 by the Las Vegas Review-Journal.

Coconut orchestra world record
On 22 March 2006, to mark the first anniversary of the official Broadway opening, the "World's Largest Coconut Orchestra", 1,789 people clapping together half coconut shells, performed in Shubert Alley, outside the theatre. The claim was officially recognised by the Guinness Book of World Records.  This record was broken by 5,877 people in Trafalgar Square at 7 pm on 23 April 2007, led by the cast from the London production, along with Jones and Gilliam, with the coconuts used in place of the whistles in "Always Look on the Bright Side of Life".  This formed part of London's St George's Day celebrations that year and was followed by a screening of Monty Python and the Holy Grail.

Other

In 2006, the London cast of Spamalot performed excerpts at the Royal Variety Performance.

On 10 March 2007, Spamalot partnered with HP Sauce (the classic British brown sauce, now made in the Netherlands following a contentious decision to close its factory in Birmingham, England) to produce 1,075 limited edition bottles featuring a unique Spamalot take on the classic HP design.  The bottles were available exclusively via Selfridges, London and came in a presentation box with a numbered certificate.  1,075 was chosen to celebrate, absurdly, "1,075 years of the show running in London".

In July 2007 it was announced that the London production would solve the problem of replacing Hannah Waddingham as the Lady of the Lake through a TV talent show in Sweden. The programme, called West End Star, which began airing on TV3 on 8 December 2007, announced Nina Söderquist as the winner on 2 February 2008. Söderquist took up the role of the Lady of the Lake, with a standing ovation, on 11 February 2008.

DVD
Portions of the Spamalot original cast recording were featured (with accompanying Flash animation) as a special feature in the 2006 "Extraordinarily Deluxe Two-Disc Edition" DVD re-release of Monty Python and the Holy Grail.

Awards and nominations
In the original Broadway production, Sara Ramirez sang the line, "I've no Grammy, no reward/I've no Tony Award." Ironically, the show's original cast album won the Grammy for Best Musical Theater Album in 2006 and Ramirez won the Tony for Best Featured Actress in 2005. The two awards led to a minor change to the song "The Diva's Lament".  Initially, the line became "My Tony Award/won't keep me out of Betty Ford's". When Lauren Kennedy took over for Sara Ramirez, it became "My predecessor won awards/and now she's in Betty Ford's" but was later changed to, "All our' Tony Awards/won't keep me out of Betty Ford's." In the touring production, Pia Glenn sings "All our goddamn awards/won't keep me out of Betty Ford's." For a change, Hannah Waddingham in the London production sings "I'm as depressed as I can be/ I've got constant PMT".

The touring production has garnered Boston's Elliot Norton Award for Outstanding Visiting Production.

Original Broadway production

Original London production

Television
A special edition of The South Bank Show was a television documentary on the history of Spamalot. It features numerous segments with Eric Idle and John Du Prez explaining the process of writing the songs, plus interviews with UK and US cast members. It included scenes from the rehearsal of the West End show, and was first broadcast on 15 October 2006.

Film adaptation
In May 2018, 20th Century Fox announced a film adaptation was in the works with Idle writing the script and Casey Nicholaw attached to direct. The film was reportedly fast tracked with casting announced soon with shooting to begin in early 2019. The next month it was reported that the studio was looking to cast Benedict Cumberbatch as King Arthur, Peter Dinklage as his servant Patsy and Tiffany Haddish as the Lady of the Lake. Cumberbatch was taken out of consideration due to his involvement in Doctor Strange in the Multiverse of Madness where he plays the title character.

At the time of the release of his memoir Always Look on the Bright Side of Life: A Sortabiography in December 2019, Idle said in an interview with the Los Angeles Times that "(the movie is) all ready to go" and that it "is not very expensive". He cited the acquisition of 21st Century Fox by Disney as a factor to the film's delay, saying it caused "everything (to come) to a grinding halt". He also stated in an interview around the same time with WBUR-FM that Haddish is still being offered the role of the Lady of the Lake, and that the script has "mostly been solved".

On 6 January 2021, it was announced that the project will move to Paramount Pictures and that it is set to begin pre-production, with Nicholaw officially confirmed to direct from Idle's script and Dan Jinks joining as a producer.

Lawsuit
In 2013, the Pythons lost a legal case to Mark Forstater, the producer of Monty Python and the Holy Grail, over royalties for Spamalot. He was paid 1/14 of the portion of the profits paid to the Pythons. The court ruled that he was a full Python partner and was to be paid 1/7 of the portion paid to the Pythons. They owed a combined £800,000 in legal fees and back royalties to Forstater, prompting them to produce Monty Python Live (Mostly).

References

Notes

Bibliography

A Quest Beyond The Grail, a review of Spamalot from the New York Times'' (registration required)
Photos, Videos, Cast Interviews and Information on the West End Production on Theatre.com
MSNBC/Newsweek interview with Idle and Nichols explaining elimination of some pre-Broadway scenes
Tim Curry interview from May 2005 from American Theatre Wing Downstage Center, recorded in MP3 format
Daily Telegraph review of West End version
Tribute to Richard Chamberlain website Spamalot
Spot Light Theatre Australia – Spamalot starting 24 July 2009

External links

 
 
 
 
 
 German production official website
 Dutch production official website 
 Swedish production official website

2005 musicals
Arthurian musical theatre
Broadway musicals
West End musicals
Fantasy theatre
Musical comedy plays
Monty Python and the Holy Grail
Musicals based on films
Musicals by Eric Idle
Musicals by John Du Prez
Metafictional plays
Self-reflexive plays
Tony Award for Best Musical
Plays set in the Middle Ages
Tony Award-winning musicals